The Medium is the student newspaper of the Mississauga branch of the University of Toronto. It has been in publication since 1974, when it was founded following the collapse of The Erindalian. It primarily covers UTM news, with occasional forays into University of Toronto tri-campus news and Mississauga news.

The Medium is published by Medium II Publications, a non-profit Ontario corporation founded in 1986 in the wake of disagreements with the Erindale College Student Union. It is funded partly by a student levy and partly through advertising sales. The corporation has also published Medium Magazine nearly annually since 2010, and run a blog division since 2013.

History 
In the spring of 1974, The Erindalian, then the student newspaper of the University of Toronto's Mississauga campus, which had been established less than a decade prior, collapsed due to a lack of funding . A student named Greg Troy, enrolled under the pseudonym Gregg-Michael Troy, founded what was then called medium II along with a number of friends. The first issue was published as a proposal to the student council for funding, with a cover story on the murder of Constance Dickey on Erindale Campus. They were awarded funding and proceeded to publish throughout the academic year. Towards the end of the year, Troy resigned during a successful campaign for the presidency of the student council, and Harry Vredenberg took his place.

Early editor-in-chief Bruce Dowbiggin's conflicts with ECSU, the student union by then established in place of the council, was representative of tensions that would arise for decades to follow. These tensions culminated in the 1986 incorporation that separated the publisher from the union's umbrage. A board and constitution were established, and all equipment was bought from the union for the nominal fee of $1.

In 1995, medium II changed its name to The Medium; the incorporated name is still Medium II Publications. In 2000, the first website was established. In 2010, Medium editors began to publish the annual Medium Magazine, a higher-quality print publication made up of long-form features. In 2013, the corporation created positions for blog editors with the responsibility of creating a secondary stream of informal, online-only content. In 2014, a video editor position was added, followed by a managing editor in 2015.

Masthead 
The Medium is published in five sections: News, Opinion, Arts, Features, and Sports. Each section has an editor in charge, with the exception of Opinion, which is managed by the editor-in-chief. A photography editor, design editor, advertising manager, distribution manager, webmaster, and copy editor make up the remaining part of the staff, along with the more recent and experimental blog, online, and video editors.

Most of the positions are elected annually, mainly those in charge of content; the rest are hired from the student population. Most of the writers are volunteers, and can earn the title of staff writer or associate editor while writing. Bookkeeping is handled externally.

Operations 
In keeping with its constitution and the Ontario requirements for non-profit corporations, Medium II Publications holds an annual audit and annual general meeting. It also holds the occasional writing and photography contest.

The corporation is considered a student society in the university's taxonomy for the purpose of distributing the student levy, whose conditions include financial record-keeping, an audit, and constitutionality. The content does not involve any administrative oversight, although a university liaison holds a non-voting seat on the board of directors. The board's remaining positions are made up five elected students, the elected editor-in-chief, and a non-voting appointed ex-officio seat.

Notable past editors and staff 
 Bruce Dowbiggin, writer for The Globe and Mail
 Sandy Mowat, son of Farley Mowat
 H.E. Robert Sabga, High Commissioner for Trinidad and Tobago
 Duncan Koerber, business communication professor at Brock University
 Robert Price, writing professor at UTM
 Richie Mehta, filmmaker
 Zaib Shaik, Director of film and entertainment City of Toronto, actor
 Ali Taha, Analyst, Innovation & Intrapreneurship at SpyderWorks Inc.

Editors
 Patricia Meehan 1984
 Trevor Finkbiner 1985

See also 
List of student newspapers in Canada
List of newspapers in Canada

References

External links 
 The Medium
 The Medium Blog

Student newspapers published in Ontario
University of Toronto
Mass media in Mississauga
Publications established in 1974
Weekly newspapers published in Ontario
1974 establishments in Ontario